Welcome to Wonderland is a documentary television series about the Wonder Girls daily life which aired on M.net. The show first aired on March 6, 2009 and covers their world tour which started March 2 in Thailand, then moved to America and finally back to Korea. The show showcases all aspects of their performance from being in the meeting room to learning choreography to actually performing on stage.

Episodes

References

External links
 Official Site: Welcome to Wonderland 

Wonder Girls
South Korean music television shows